An air-fuel ratio meter monitors the air–fuel ratio of an internal combustion engine. Also called air–fuel ratio gauge, air–fuel meter, or air–fuel gauge, it reads the voltage output of an oxygen sensor, sometimes also called AFR sensor or lambda sensor.

The original narrow-band oxygen sensors became factory installed standard in the late 1970s and early 1980s. In recent years a newer and much more accurate wide-band sensor, though more expensive, has become available.

Most stand-alone narrow-band meters have 10 LEDs and some have more. Also common, narrow band meters in round housings with the standard mounting  diameters, as other types of car 'gauges'. These usually have 10 or 20 LEDs. Analogue 'needle' style gauges are also available.

As stated above, there are wide-band meters that stand alone or are mounted in housings. Nearly all of these show the air–fuel ratio on a numeric display since the wide-band sensors provide a much more accurate reading. As wide-band sensors use more accurate electronics, these meters are more expensive.

Benefits of air–fuel ratio metering
 Determining the condition of the oxygen sensor: A malfunctioning oxygen sensor will result in air–fuel ratios that respond more slowly to changing engine conditions. A damaged or defective sensor may lead to increased fuel consumption and increased pollutant emissions as well as decreased power and throttle response. Most engine management systems will detect a defective oxygen sensor.
 Reducing emissions: Keeping the air–fuel mixture near the stoichiometric ratio of 14.7:1 (for gasoline engines) allows the catalytic converter to operate at maximum efficiency.
 Fuel economy: An air–fuel mixture leaner than the stoichiometric ratio will result in near-optimal fuel mileage, costing less per distance traveled and producing the least amount of CO2 emissions. However, from the factory, cars are designed to operate at the stoichiometric ratio (rather than as lean as possible while remaining drivable) to maximize the efficiency and life of the catalytic converter. While it may be possible to run smoothly at mixtures leaner than the stoichiometric ratio, manufacturers must focus on emissions and especially catalytic converter life (which must now be  on new vehicles ) as a higher priority due to U.S. EPA regulations.
 Engine performance: Carefully mapping out air–fuel ratios throughout the range of rpm and manifold pressure will maximize power output in addition to reducing the risk of detonation.

Lean mixtures improve the fuel economy but also cause sharp rises in the amount of nitrogen oxides (NOX). If the mixture becomes too lean, the engine may fail to ignite, causing misfire and a large increase in unburned hydrocarbon (HC) emissions. Lean mixtures burn hotter and may cause rough idle, hard starting and stalling, and can even damage the catalytic converter, or burn valves in the engine. The risk of spark knock/engine knocking (detonation) is also increased when the engine is under load.

Mixtures that are richer than stoichiometric allow for greater peak engine power when using vaporized liquid fuel due to the mixture not being able to reach a perfectly homogenized state so extra fuel is added to ensure all oxygen is burned producing maximum power. The ideal mixture in this type of operation depends on the individual engine. For example, engines with forced induction such as turbochargers and superchargers typically require a richer mixture under wide open throttle than naturally aspirated engines. Forced induction engines can be catastrophically damaged by burning too lean for too long. The leaner the air–fuel mixture, the higher the combustion temperature is inside the cylinder. Too high a temperature will destroy an engine – melting the pistons and valves. This can happen if one ports the head and/or manifolds or increase boost without compensating by installing larger or more injectors, and/or increasing the fuel pressure to a sufficient level. Conversely, engine performance can be lessened by increasing fueling without increasing air flow into the engine.
Furthermore, if an engine is leaned to the point where its exhaust gas temperature starts to fall, its cylinder head temperature will also fall. This is only recommended in the cruising configuration, never when accelerating hard, but is becoming increasingly popular in aviation circles, where the appropriate engine monitoring gauges are fitted and the fuel air mixture can be manually adjusted.

Cold engines also typically require more fuel and a richer mixture when first started (see: cold start injector), because fuel does not vaporize as well when cold and therefore requires more fuel to properly "saturate" the air. Rich mixtures also burn faster and decrease the risk of spark knock/engine knocking (detonation) when the engine is under load. However, rich mixtures sharply increase carbon monoxide (CO) emissions.

Sensor types

Zirconia oxygen sensor
The early introduction of the oxygen sensor came about in the late 1970s. Since then zirconia has been the material of choice for its construction. The zirconia O2 sensor produces its own voltage, which production makes it a type of generator. The varying voltage will display on a scope as a waveform somewhat resembling a sine wave when in closed loop control. The actual voltage that is generated is a measure of the oxygen that is needed to complete the combustion of the CO and HC present at the sensor tip. The stoichiometric air-fuel ratio mixture ratio for gasoline engine is the theoretical air-fuel ratio at which all of the fuel will react with all of the available oxygen resulting in complete combustion. At or near this ratio, the combustion process produces the best balance between power and low emissions. At the stoichiometric air-fuel ratio, the generated O2 sensor voltage is about 450 mV. The Engine Control Module (ECM) recognizes a rich condition above the 450 mV level, and a lean condition below it, but does not detect the extent of the richness or leanness. It is for this reason that the zirconia O2 sensor is called a “narrow-band” O2 sensor.

Titanium oxygen sensor
The titanium O2 sensor was used throughout the late 1980s and early 1990s on a limited basis. This sensor's semiconductor construction makes its operation different from that of the zirconia O2 sensor. Instead of generating its own voltage, the titanium O2 sensor's electrical resistance changes according to the exhaust oxygen content. When the air/fuel ratio is rich, the resistance of the sensor is around 950 ohms and more than 21 kilohms when the mixture is lean. As with the zirconia sensor, the titanium O2 sensor is also considered a narrow-band O2 sensor.

Narrow-band sensor

As mentioned before, the main problem with any narrow-band O2 sensor is that the ECM only detects that the mixture is slightly richer or leaner than the stoichiometric ratio. The ECM does not measure the operating air-fuel ratio outside the stoichiometric range. In effect it only detects that the mixture is richer or leaner than stoichiometry. An O2 sensor voltage that goes lower than 450 mV will cause a widening of injector pulse and vice versa. The resulting changing or cycling fuel control (closed-loop) O2 signal is what the technician sees on the scope when probing at the O2 sensor signal wire.

Wide-band sensors
The newer “wide-band” O2 sensor solves the narrow sensing problem of the previous zirconia sensors. These sensors are often called by different names such as continuous lambda sensors (lambda representing air-fuel ratio), AFR (air-fuel ratio sensors), LAF (lean air-fuel sensor) and wide-band O2 sensor. Regardless of the name, the principle is the same, which is to put the ECM in a better position to control the air/fuel mixture. In effect, the wide-band O2 sensor can detect the exhaust's O2 content way below or above the perfect air/fuel ratio. Such control is needed on new lean burning engines with extremely low emission output levels. Tighter emission regulations and demands for better fuel economy are driving this newer fuel control technology.

Construction and operation
The wide-band O2 sensor looks similar in appearance to the regular zirconia O2 sensor. Its inner construction and operation are totally different, however. The wide-band O2 sensor is composed of two inner layers called the reference cell and the pump cell. The ECM's AFR sensor circuitry always tries to keep a perfect air/fuel ratio inside a special monitoring chamber (diffusion chamber or pump-cell circuit) by way of controlling its current. The AFR sensor uses dedicated electronic circuitry to set a pumping current in the sensor's pump cell. In other words, if the air/fuel mixture is lean, the pump cell circuit voltage momentarily goes low and the ECM immediately regulates the current going through it in order to maintain a set voltage value or stoichiometric ratio inside the diffusion chamber. The pump cell then discharges the excess oxygen through the diffusion gap by means of the current created in the pump-cell circuit. The ECM senses the current and widens injector pulsation accordingly to add fuel.

If on the other hand the air/fuel mixture goes rich, the pump cell circuit voltage rapidly climbs high and the ECM immediately reverses the current polarity to readjust the pump cell circuit voltage to its set stable value. The pump cell then pumps oxygen into the monitoring chamber by way of the reversed current in the ECM's AFR pump cell circuit. The ECM detects the reversed current and an injector pulsation-reduction command is issued bringing the mixture back to lean. Since the current in the pump cell circuit is also proportional to the oxygen concentration or deficiency in the exhaust, it serves as an index of the air/fuel ratio. The ECM is constantly monitoring the pump cell current circuitry, which it always tries to keep at a set voltage. For this reason, the techniques used to test and diagnose the regular zirconia O2 sensor can not be used to test the wide-band AFR sensor. These sensors are current-driven devices and do not have a cycling voltage waveform. The testing procedures, which will be discussed later, are quite different from the older O2 sensors.

Comparison with mass airflow sensor
The AFR sensor operation can be thought of as being similar to the hot wire mass airflow sensor (MAF). But, instead of an MAF hot wire, the ECM tries to keep a perfectly stoichiometric air/fuel ratio inside the monitoring chamber by varying the pump cell circuit current. The sensing part at the tip of the sensor, is always held at a constant voltage (depending on manufacturer). If the mixture goes rich, the ECM will adjust the current flowing through the sensing tip or pump cell circuit until the constant operating voltage level is achieved again. The voltage change happens very fast. The current through the pump circuit also pushes along the oxygen atoms either into, or out of, the diffusion chamber (monitoring chamber) which restores the monitoring chamber's air/fuel ratio to stoichiometry. Although the ECM varies the current, it tries to maintain the pump circuit at a constant voltage potential.

Testing
As the ECM monitors the varying current, a special circuit (also inside the PCM or Power-train Control Module) converts the current into a voltage value and passes it on to the serial data stream as an OBD-II PID (not to be confused with a PID controller). This is why the best way to test an AFR sensor's signal is by monitoring the voltage conversion circuitry, which the ECM sends out as an AFR-voltage PID. It is possible to monitor the actual AFR sensor varying current, but the changes are very small (in the low milliamp range) and difficult to monitor. A second drawback to a manual AFR current test is that the signal wire has to be cut or broken to connect the ammeter in series with the pump circuit. Today's average clamp-on ammeter is not accurate enough at such a small scale. For this reason, the easiest (but not the only) way to test an AFR sensor is with the scanner.

By using a scanner to communicate with the ECM, one can view AFR sensor activity. This data is typically displayed as WRAF (Wide Range Air Fuel), A/F, or AFR sensor voltage. However, on some vehicles and scanners it will show up as "lambda" or "equivalence ratio." If the PID displays a voltage reading, it should be equal to the sensor's reference voltage when the air/fuel mixture is ideal. The reference voltage varies from car to car, but is often 3.3 V or 2.6 V. When the fuel mixture becomes richer (on a sudden, quick acceleration), the voltage should decrease. Under lean conditions (such as deceleration) the voltage should increase.

If the scanner PID displays a "lambda" or "equivalence ratio," the reading should be 1.0 under stoichiometric conditions. Numbers above 1.0 indicate a lean condition while numbers below 1.0 indicate rich mixtures. The ECM uses the information from the sensors to adjust the amount of fuel being injected into the engine, so corresponding changes in the short-term fuel trim PID(s) should also be seen. Lean mixture readings from the AFR sensor will prompt the ECM to add fuel, which will manifest itself as a positive (or more positive) short-term fuel trim percentage.

Some technicians will force the engine to run lean by creating a vacuum leak downstream from the mass airflow sensor, and then watch scanner PIDs for a response. The engine can be forced rich by adding a metered amount of propane to the incoming airflow. In either case, if the sensor does not respond, it likely has a problem. However, these tests do not rule out other circuitry problems or ECM issues.  Thorough, systematic diagnosis is recommended.

Operating temperature
On these units the temperature is very critical and for this reason a special pulse-width controlled heater circuit is employed to control the heater temperature precisely. The ECM controls the heater circuit.

Advantages
The wide operating range coupled with the inherent fast acting operation of the AFR sensor, puts the system always at stoichiometry, which reduces a great deal of emissions. With this type of fuel control, the air/fuel ratio is always hovering close to 14.7:1. If the mixture goes slightly rich the ECM adjusts the pump circuit's current to maintain the set operating voltage. The current is detected by the ECM's detection circuit, with the result of a command for a reduction in injector pulsation being issued. As soon as the air-fuel mixture changes back to stoichiometry, because of the reduction in injector pulsation, the ECM will adjust the current respectively. The end result is no current (0.00 amperes) at 14.7:1 air-fuel ratio. In this case a light negative hump is seen on the ammeter with the reading returning to 0.00 almost immediately. The fuel correction happens very quickly.

Practicalities of operation
A narrow-band sensor has a nonlinear output, with ranges from 0.10v to 1.0v with .450 being ideal. Narrow-band sensors are temperature-dependent. If the exhaust gases become warmer, the output voltage in the lean area will rise, and in the rich area it will be lowered. Consequently, a sensor, without pre-heating, has a lower lean-output and a higher rich-output, possibly even exceeding 1 volt. The influence of temperature on voltage is smaller in the lean mode than in the rich mode.

A "cold" engine makes the computer change the fuel air ratio so the output voltage of the o2 sensor switches between about 100 and 850/900 mV and after a while the sensor may output a switch voltage between about 200 and 700/750 mV, for turbocharged cars even less.

The engine control unit (ECU) when operating in "closed loop" tends to maintain zero oxygen (thus a stoichiometric balance), wherein the air–fuel mixture is approximately 14.7 times the mass of air to fuel for gasoline. This ratio maintains a "neutral" engine performance (lower fuel consumption yet decent engine power and minimal pollution).

The average level of the sensor is near to 450 mV. Since catalytic converters need a cycling a/f ratio the oxygen sensor is not allowed to hold a fixed voltage, the ECU controls the engine by providing the mixture between lean (and rich) in such a sufficiently fast manner by means of shorter (or longer) time of signal to injectors, so the average level becomes as stated about 450 mV.

A wide-band sensor, on the other hand, has a very linear output, 0–5 V, and requires a much hotter running temperature.

Which type of air–fuel ratio meter to be used
If the purpose of the air–fuel ratio meter is to detect also an existing or possible problem with the sensor above of checking the general mixture and performance, a narrow band air-fuel ratio meter is sufficient.

In high-performance tuning applications, the wide-band system is desirable.

See also
Automobile emissions control
Car tuning
Engine control unit (ECU)
Engine tuning
Air–fuel ratio
Exhaust gas analyzer
Oxygen sensor

References

External links 
Airfuelratiometers.com, including illustrated information.
Diagnostics Strategies of Modern Automotive Systems

Engine components
Engine tuning instruments
Engine technology
Sensors